SkyWay Charity is a youth organisation based in the Shoreditch area of Hackney, London. Established in 2001, SkyWay empowers disadvantaged eight to 25-year-olds in London and their local communities by providing opportunities that enable them to achieve personal goals, realise their potential and contribute positively to their community.    

SkyWay provides end-to-end support to young people with a particular focus on the transition ages supporting them to become positive role models and leaders in their communities. They focus on progression pathways, peer to peer work, developing social and emotional skills and outlook. Activities include 'drop in' youth club activities in various locations, outreach and detached work, sports activities, music and media production, holiday activities and lifestyle training and support. 

All activities are provided FREE to young people.

Their core projects are:  

SkyWay Futures

Focusing on the transitional stages young people go through as they move from childhood to young adulthood. SkyWay supports young people to develop the skills, confidence and resilience to address the challenges many of them face, helping them to form a positive sense of identity and increasing aspiration.

SkyWay Futures is split into three programmes:

1) Transitions

For young people aged 8 – 14 years old, focusing on developing their skills, confidence and resilience, providing a safe environment, diverting them away from criminal and anti-social behaviour, supporting positive engagement with the community and increasing their expectations about what they can achieve.

2) Active

For young people aged 15+ providing targeted support to develop resilience and confidence, widen their choices for their futures and encourage independence, responsibility and self-determination.

3) Fun

Term-time and holiday sessions which engage young people in fun activities and build positive relationships between young people and the wider community.

Employment and Enterprise

SkyWay supports young people to develop and utilise their skills, helping them to gain qualifications, experience and employment through job clubs and one to one to support and advice. We also give them the opportunity, advice and support to create their own business.

Alternative Education

Skyway teaches and facilitates the education of young people at risk of low attendance or social exclusion. They deliver a comprehensive range of vocational learning including: enterprise, mechanics, beauty, literacy and numeracy to support the positive progression of the young people

SkyWay Ambassadors

SkyWay Ambassadors is a highly commended peer development programme. The Ambassadors are trained and gain qualifications to support the delivery of activities and workshops for younger children who see them as positive role models they want to emulate. SkyWay Ambassadors volunteer and work in the local community, delivering activities in community settings and schools, and some continue training to become the next cohort of youth workers.

SkyWay Ambassadors specialise in providing support in:

- Mental health awareness

- Sexual health

- Money management

- Healthy eating and budgeting

- Sports coaching

- Leadership and mentoring

- Life skills

Notes

External links
 skyway.london SkyWay website

Youth organisations based in the United Kingdom